The Clown-class gunboat was a class of twelve gunboats ordered by the Royal Navy in January 1856 for use in the Crimean War, although by the time they were completed, later that year, the Crimean War was over and some of these gunboats were sent to the Far East and took part in the Second Opium War.

Design
The Clown class was an improved version of the preceding  designed by W.H. Walker. The ships were wooden-hulled, with steam power as well as sails, and of particularly shallow draught (design draught ) for coastal bombardment in shallow waters.

Sail plan

Propulsion

Armament
Ships of the class were armed with one 68-pounder and one 32-pounder smooth bore muzzle loading cannons.

Ships

References

Gunboat classes
 Clown
Gunboats of the Royal Navy